is a railway station in Midori-ku, Nagoya, Japan, operated by Central Japan Railway Company (JR Tōkai).

Lines
Ōdaka Station is served by the Tōkaidō Main Line, and is located 353.6 kilometers from the starting point of the line at Tokyo Station.

Station layout
The station has one elevated island platform with the station building underneath. The station building has automated ticket machines, TOICA automated turnstiles and a staffed ticket office.

Platforms

Adjacent stations

|-
!colspan=5|Central Japan Railway Company

Station history
Ōdaka Station was opened on March 1, 1886 with the completion of the Japanese Government Railway (JGR) line connecting Taketoyo Station and Atsuta Station. This line was named the Tōkaidō Line in 1895 and the Tōkaidō Main Line in 1909. A new station building was completed in March 1935.  The JGR became the JNR after World War II. All freight operations were discontinued from August 1961. A new station building was completed in May 1962, but was relocated to its present location and rebuilt in 1978. With the privatization and dissolution of the JNR on April 1, 1987, the station came under the control of the  Central Japan Railway Company.

Station numbering was introduced to the section of the Tōkaidō Line operated JR Central in March 2018; Ōdaka Station was assigned station number CA63.

Passenger statistics
In fiscal 2017, the station was used by an average of 4,323 passengers daily

Surrounding area
site of the Battle of Okehazama
Midori-ku Ward Office

See also
 List of Railway Stations in Japan

References

Yoshikawa, Fumio. Tokaido-sen 130-nen no ayumi. Grand-Prix Publishing (2002) .

External links

Official home page

Railway stations in Japan opened in 1886
Tōkaidō Main Line
Stations of Central Japan Railway Company
Railway stations in Nagoya
Railway stations in Aichi Prefecture